John Tate may refer to:

 John Tate (mathematician) (1925–2019), American mathematician
 John Torrence Tate Sr. (1889–1950), American physicist
 John Percival Tate (1895–1977), Australian politician
 John Tate (actor) (1915–1979), Australian actor
 John Stuart Tate, Australian politician
 John Tate (boxer) (1955–1998), World Heavyweight Champion
 John Tate (Lord Mayor of London, 1473) (died 1479), Lord Mayor of London
 John Tate (papermaker) (died 1507/8), English paper maker
 John Tate (Lord Mayor of London) (died 1515), Lord Mayor, 1496 and 1514
 John Tate (footballer) (1892–1973), English footballer
 John Tate, a character in The Faculty

See also
Jack Tate (disambiguation)
John Tait (disambiguation)